The 2018–19 FC Anzhi Makhachkala season was the club's fourth season back in the Russian Premier League, the highest tier of football in Russia, since their relegation at the end of the  2013–14 season. Anzhi finished the season 15th in the league, being relegated back to the Russian Football National League, whilst they were knocked out of the Russian Cup at the Round of 16 stage by Spartak Moscow.

Season events
With manager Vadim Skripchenko's contract expiring at the end of the 2017–18 season, was replaced by Magomed Adiyev on 4 June 2018

Anzhi Makhachkala were initially relegated at the end of the 2017–18 season, but FC Amkar Perm announced on 13 June that the Russian Football Union had recalled their 2018–19 license, making them ineligible for the Russian Premier League or Russian Football National League. Anzhi then re-applied for their Premier League membership on 15 June, with their admission to the 2018–19 Russian Premier League being confirmed on 22 June.

On 10 May 2019, following a 0-1 defeat to Arsenal Tula, their relegation back to the Russian Football National League was confirmed.

Squad

Out on loan

Transfers

In

Out

Loans in

Loans out

Released

Friendlies

Competitions

Russian Premier League

Results by round

Results

League table

Russian Cup

Squad statistics

Appearances and goals

|-
|colspan="14"|Players away from the club on loan:
|-
|colspan="14"|Players who left Anzhi Makhachkala during the season:

|}

Goal scorers

Disciplinary record

References

External links
Official website
Fans' website 
A fan is a club Anji

FC Anzhi Makhachkala seasons
Anzhi Makhachkala